Tickenham, Nailsea and Kenn Moors SSSI is a 129.4 hectare biological Site of Special Scientific Interest between Tickenham, Nailsea and Kenn on the North Somerset Levels, notified in 1995.

The soils in the area include both clays of the Allerton and Wentloog Series and peat soils of the Sedgemoor and Godney Series, which are drained by a network of large rhynes and smaller field ditches, which support exceptionally rich plant and invertebrate fauna communities. Exceptional populations of Coleoptera occur with at least 12 nationally scarce species and two nationally rare species, including Britain's largest water beetle the Great Silver Water Beetle (Hydrophilus piceus).

See also

 Biddle Street, Yatton and Puxton Moor, two other similar SSSIs on the North Somerset Levels.

References

Sites of Special Scientific Interest in North Somerset
Sites of Special Scientific Interest notified in 1995
Nailsea